The 2022 Hungarian Darts Trophy was the tenth of thirteen PDC European Tour events on the 2022 PDC Pro Tour. The tournament took place at the BOK Sportcsarnok, Budapest, Hungary, from 2–4 September 2022. It featured a field of 48 players and £140,000 in prize money, with £25,000 going to the winner.

 was the defending champion after defeating  8–2 in the 2021 final. However, he withdrew from the tournament before it started.

 won his third European tour title, defeating  8–2 in the final.

The tournament equalled the European tour record for the most seeded players losing their first match as 11 of 16 players including Michael van Gerwen and Peter Wright lost in the second round. The previous event which involved 11 seeds being eliminated was the 2019 Czech Darts Open.

Prize money
The prize money was unchanged from the European Tours of the last 3 years:

 Seeded players who lose in the second round and host nation qualifiers (who qualify automatically as a result of their ranking) who lose in their first match of the event shall not be credited with prize money on any Order of Merit. A player who qualifies as a qualifier, but later becomes a seed due to the withdrawal of one or more other players shall be credited with their prize money on all Orders of Merit regardless of how far they progress in the event.

Qualification and format
The top 16 entrants from the PDC ProTour Order of Merit on 28 June automatically qualified for the event and were seeded in the second round.

The remaining 32 places went to players from six qualifying events – 24 from the Tour Card Holder Qualifier (held on 7 July), two from the Associate Member Qualifier (held on 24 April), as there was only one Hungarian on the Order of Merit, three Hungarians would qualify from the Host Nation Qualifier (held on 10 July), one from the Nordic & Baltic Associate Member Qualifier (held on 3 June), and one from the East European Associate Member Qualifier (held on 25 June).

Gerwyn Price withdrew from the tournament after the draw was made, so Madars Razma received a bye to the third round. Rowby-John Rodriguez withdrew for family reasons, meaning Raymond van Barneveld received a bye to the second round.

The following players took part in the tournament:

Top 16
  (second round)
  (second round)
  (withdrew)
  (third round)
  (second round)
  (second round)
  (second round)
  (second round)
  (semi-finals)
  (third round)
  (champion)
  (quarter-finals)
  (second round)
  (second round)
  (second round)
  (second round)

Tour Card Qualifier
  (first round)
  (first round)
  (semi-finals)
  (quarter-finals)
  (first round)
  (quarter-finals)
  (second round)
  (withdrew)
  (second round)
  (third round)
  (Second  round)
  (runner-up)
  (first round)
  (third round)
  (first round)
  (second round)
  (second round)
  (third round)
  (third round)
  (quarter-finals)
  (first round)
  (third round)
  (first round)
  (first round)

Associate Member Qualifier
  (first round)
  (first round)

Highest Ranked Hungarian
  (first round)

Host Nation Qualifier
  (first round)
  (first round)
  (first round)

Nordic & Baltic Qualifier
  (first round)

East European Qualifier
  (third round)

Draw

Notes

References

2022 PDC Pro Tour
2022 PDC European Tour
2022 in Hungarian sport
September 2022 sports events in Hungary